Stenosteus is an extinct monospecific genus of medium-sized selenosteid arthrodire placoderms of the Late Devonian period known from the Upper Famennian Cleveland Shale of Ohio. Estimated skull lengths range from 6 to 9 centimeters Most fossils of Stenosteus have been scraps of armor and portions of tooth-plates suggestive of Selenosteus. In 1996, enough material of a new species, S. angustopectus, was recovered to allow a reconstruction of armor that resembles that of Selenosteus.

Phylogeny
Stenosteus is a member of the family Selenosteidae of the clade Aspinothoracidi, which belongs to the clade Pachyosteomorphi, one of the two major clades within Eubrachythoraci. The cladogram below shows the phylogeny of Stenosteus:

References

Selenosteidae
Placoderms of North America
Paleontology in Ohio
Famennian life
Famennian genus first appearances
Famennian genus extinctions